Tarmo Timm (born 4 June 1936) is an Estonian zoologist (Annelida).

He has described the following taxa:
 Baltidrilus Timm, 2013
 Peipsidrilus Timm, 1977

See also
History of zoology
List of zoologists
Timeline of zoology

References

1936 births
Estonian zoologists
Living people
Place of birth missing (living people)